Lel or LEL may refer to:

People
Lehel, also known as Lél (died 995), Magyar chieftain
Katya Lel (born 1974), Russian pop singer
Martin Lel (born 1978), Kenyan athlete
Letitia Elizabeth Landon (1802–1838), English writer better known as L.E.L.

Places 
Lel, Alicante, Valencian Community, Spain
Lel, Gaynsky District, Perm Krai, Russia
Lel (river), Perm Krai, Russia

Religion 
 Lel, a Polish divine twin; see Lel and Polel
 Mount Lel, abode of the deity Ēl in the Ugaritic Baal cycle

Technology and science
Lower explosive limit, in relation to flammability of gases
lel, a ligand conformation in tris(ethylenediamine)cobalt(III) chloride and related complexes

Transport
 Lake Evella Airport (IATA:LEL), Northern Territory, Australia
 Lelant railway station (National Rail code: LEL), Cornwall, UK

Other uses 
Lake Erie League, an Ohio High School Athletic Association conference
League of Empire Loyalists, a British pressure group established in 1954
LEL Arena, in Whitehaven, Cumbria, England
Lele language (Bantu)
London–Edinburgh–London, a randonnée bicycle event
"Lel", a satirical form of "lol", meaning "laughing even louder"